STS-61-B was NASA's 23rd Space Shuttle mission, and its second using Space Shuttle Atlantis. The shuttle was launched from Kennedy Space Center, Florida, on November 26, 1985. During STS-61-B, the shuttle crew deployed three communications satellites, and tested techniques of constructing structures in orbit. Atlantis landed at Edwards Air Force Base, California, at 16:33:49 EST on December 3, 1985, after 6 days, 21 hours, 4 minutes, and 49 seconds in orbit.

The mission was also notable for carrying the first Mexican astronaut, Rodolfo Neri Vela. This was also Atlantis second and final mission before the Space Shuttle Challenger disaster in 1986. The Challenger disaster would ground the shuttle fleet for two and a half years and Atlantis would not fly again until STS-27, which launched three years later on December 2, 1988.

Crew

Backup crew

Crew seating arrangements

Shuttle processing 
After landing at the Edwards Air Force Base at the end of STS-51-J on October 7, 1985, Atlantis returned to the Kennedy Space Center on October 12, 1985. The shuttle was moved directly into an Orbiter Processing Facility (OPF), where post-flight de-servicing and pre-flight processing took place simultaneously.

After only 26 days in the OPF, a record fast processing in the history of the Space Shuttle program, the shuttle was rolled to the Vehicle Assembly Building (VAB) on November 7, 1985. Atlantis was mated with the External Tank (ET) and Solid Rocket Booster (SRB) stack and was rolled out to launch LC-39A on November 12, 1985.

Payload 

Three satellites were deployed during this mission: Aussat-2, Morelos-2, and Satcom-K2. Aussat-2 and Morelos-2 were the second satellites in their series (the first satellites in the series were deployed during STS-51-I and STS-51-G). Both of these were Hughes Space and Communications HS-376 satellites and were equipped with a Payload Assist Module (PAM-D) booster to reach geostationary transfer orbit (GTO). Satcom-K2 was a version of the RCA 4000 series satellites, which were owned and operated by RCA American Communications (RCA). This satellite was deployed using a PAM-D2 booster (which was a larger version of the PAM-D). This was the first flight of the PAM-D2 booster on a Space Shuttle.

All three satellites were successfully deployed, one at a time, and their booster stages fired automatically to lift them to geostationary transfer orbits. Their respective owners assumed charge, and later fired the onboard kick motors at apogee, to circularize the orbits and align them with the equator.

Middeck payloads 
 Continuous Flow Electrophoresis System (CFES)
 Diffusive Mixing of Organic Solutions (DMOS)
 Morelos Payload Specialist Experiments (MPSE) and Orbiter Experiments (OEX)

Other items 
A checkered racing flag was carried on board Atlantis during STS-61-B; the flag is now on display at the Indianapolis Motor Speedway Hall of Fame Museum. This was also the second test flight of the Orbiter Experiments (OEX) advanced autopilot. It ran for approximately 65 hours and demonstrated the ability to fly the orbiter on nose jets only, aft jets only, to automatically stationkeep on another satellite and to fly an orbit with zero aerodynamic drag. The OEX autopilot was also more fuel efficient than the baseline system.

Mission summary 

Space Shuttle Atlantis lifted off from Launch Complex 39A at Kennedy Space Center at 19:29:00 p.m. EST on November 26, 1985. The launch marked the second night launch of the Space Shuttle program, and the ninth and final flight of 1985.

A key element of the mission's objectives was EASE/ACCESS, an experiment in assembling large structures in space. EASE/ACCESS was a joint venture between the Langley Research Center (LRC) and the Marshall Space Flight Center (MSFC). ACCESS was a "high-rise" tower composed of many small struts and nodes. EASE was a geometric structure shaped like an inverted pyramid, that was composed of a few large beams and nodes. Together, these experiments demonstrated the feasibility of assembling large preformed structures in space. Astronauts Ross and Spring performed two spacewalks on the mission, which marked the 50th, and 51st extravehicular activity (EVAs) for the United States, and the 12th and the 13th for the Shuttle program. An IMAX camera mounted in the cargo bay filmed the activities of the astronauts engaged in the EASE/ACCESS work, as well as other scenes of interest.

"This is probably not the preferred way of building a space station", Ross said later of EASE. The astronauts reported that the most difficult part of the spacewalks was torquing their own masses while holding the EASE beams. They found that ACCESS worked well, while EASE required too much free floating. The astronauts judged that performing six-hour spacewalks every other day over a five or six-day period was feasible, and recommended glove changes to reduce hand fatigue. Ross said in the EVA debrief that the crew had tried to have the Manned Maneuvering Unit (MMU) manifested for use in the second spacewalk, because "for certain applications it would be very useful. In particular if you were building portions of a space station attached to the orbiter, then moving those portions farther than the manipulator arm could transport them". He added that the MMU could be used to attach cable runs and instruments in places that were out of reach of the shuttle's robotic arm (Canadarm).

During the mission astronaut Rodolfo Neri Vela accomplished a series of experiments, that were primarily related to human physiology. He also photographed Mexico and Mexico City as part of the mission's Earth observations. However, Commander Brewster Shaw installed a padlock on the hatch control because he was "particularly concerned" that the Mexican could "flip out" during the mission. Shaw had noted that he didn't think that Neri Vela noticed the padlock, but that the other members of the crew did. Astronaut Charles Walker again operated the Continuous Flow Electrophoresis System (CFES), the third flight of this larger and improved equipment, to produce commercial pharmaceutical products in microgravity. An experiment in Diffusive Mixing of Organic Solutions (DMOS), was conducted successfully for 3M. The object of this experiment was to grow single crystals that were larger and more pure than any that could be grown on Earth. One Getaway Special (GAS) canister stored in Atlantiss payload bay carried a Canadian student experiment, which involved the fabrication of mirrors in microgravity with higher performance than ones made on Earth.

All the experiments on this mission were successfully accomplished, and all equipment operated within established parameters. Atlantis landed safely at Edwards Air Force Base at 16:33:49 EST on December 3, 1985, after a mission lasting 6 days, 21 hours, 4 minutes, 49 seconds. Atlantis landed one orbit earlier than planned due to lighting concerns at the Edwards. Rollout distance on landing was  lasting 78 seconds.

Spacewalks 
Two spacewalks were conducted during the STS-61-B mission to demonstrate assembly techniques which might be used in space station assembly.

Wake-up calls 
NASA began a tradition of playing music to astronauts during the Project Gemini, and first used music to wake up a flight crew during Apollo 15. Each track is specially chosen, often by the astronauts' families, and usually has a special meaning to an individual member of the crew, or is applicable to their daily activities.

See also 

 List of human spaceflights
 List of Space Shuttle missions

References

External links 
 STS-61B Video Highlights 

Space Shuttle missions
Edwards Air Force Base
1985 in spaceflight
Spacecraft launched in 1985